Stephanie Germain is an American television and film producer. Notable credits include The Day After Tomorrow, The Nora Roberts Film Collection, The Murder, She Baked Film Series, and Ike: Countdown to D-Day, for which she was nominated for the Primetime Emmy Award for Outstanding Television Movie

Background
After beginning her career at ABC News, she moved to Los Angeles to work as a development executive for Von Zerneck/Sertner Films and Oliver Stone. She then had producing deals at Mandalay Pictures Television and Sony Pictures Television prior to forming her own independent company.

Credits

Murder She Baked: Just Desserts (TV Movie 2017, Executive Producer)
Murder She Baked: A Deadly Recipe (TV Movie 2016, Executive Producer) 
Murder She Baked: A Peach Cobbler Mystery (TV Movie 2016, Executive Producer)
Murder She Baked: A Plum Pudding Mystery (TV Movie 2015, Executive Producer)
Murder She Baked, Just Desserts (TV Movie 2015, Executive Producer)
Hide (TV Movie 2011, Executive Producer)
Carnal Innocence (TV Movie 2011, Executive Producer)
Tribute (TV Movie 2009, Executive Producer)
High Noon (TV Movie 2009, Executive Producer)
Midnight Bayou (TV Movie 2009, Executive Producer)
Northern Lights (TV Movie 2009, Executive Producer)
Carolina Moon (TV Movie 2007, Executive Producer)
Blue Smoke (TV Movie 2007, Executive Producer)
Angels Fall (film) (TV Movie 2007, Executive Producer)
Montana Sky (TV Movie 2007, Executive Producer)
A Perfect Day (TV Movie 2006, Executive Producer)
Ike: Countdown to D-Day (TV Movie 2004, Executive Producer)
The Day After Tomorrow (Feature 2004, Executive Producer)
Gracie’s Choice (TV Movie 2004, Executive Producer)
Jeremiah (TV Series 2002–2004, Executive Producer)
Superfire (TV Movie 2002, Executive Producer)
The Pilot’s Wife (TV Movie 2011, Executive Producer)
The Princess and the Marine (TV Movie 2001, Executive Producer)
King of the World (TV Movie 2000, Executive Producer)
Fatal Error (TV Movie 1999, Co-Executive Producer)
Too Rich: The Secret Life of Doris Duke (TV Movie 1999, Producer)
Virtual Obsession (TV Movie 1998, Producer)
Holiday in Your Heart (TV Movie 1997, Producer)
Mother Knows Best (TV Movie 2011, Co-Producer)
No One Would Tell (TV Movie 1996, Co-Producer)

References

External links 

American film producers
Year of birth missing (living people)
Living people